Jaromír Ježek (born 13 November 1986, Hradec Králové) is a Czech judoka.  He has competed at the 2008 and 2012 Summer Olympics.  At the 2008 Summer Olympics, he lost in the first round to Shokir Muminov.  He went one round better at the 2012 Summer Olympics, where he beat Aleni Smith in his first match, before losing to Wang Ki-Chun in the next.

Achievements

References

External links
 
 

1986 births
Living people
Czech male judoka
Olympic judoka of the Czech Republic
Judoka at the 2008 Summer Olympics
Judoka at the 2012 Summer Olympics
Judoka at the 2016 Summer Olympics
Sportspeople from Hradec Králové
Universiade medalists in judo
Universiade bronze medalists for the Czech Republic
European Games competitors for the Czech Republic
Judoka at the 2015 European Games
Medalists at the 2009 Summer Universiade